Paquita Escribano (Zaragoza, 1880 - Valencia, 1970) was a popular Spanish singer. A cupletista and tonadillera, she recorded 39 albums. Among her most popular songs were Ven y ven (La mejicana), El polichinela, El apache moderno, La mariposa, Tirana del Tripilí, La foot-balista, Mimosa, ¿Solo o con leche?, La cucaracha, Zulina, la esclava, Bella samaritana and La guitarra agarena. She retired to Valencia with her husband where she died in 1970.

Biography
Escribano was a Spanish tonadillera, a magnified and glorified vaudeville singer. Her single act constituted the entire performance, and featured the Spanish song type known as Cuplé. Characterized as being "one of the best of the type", she did not take well in some parts of South America. She was considered as unusually handsome with black hair and dark eyes.

References

External links

1880 births
1970 deaths
People from Zaragoza
Singers from Aragon
Spanish musical theatre actresses
Cabaret singers
Cupletistas
Tonadilleras
20th-century Spanish women singers
20th-century Spanish singers